Marvin Wilbur Kaplan (January 24, 1927 – August 25, 2016) was an American actor, playwright and screenwriter. Best known as Henry Beesmeyer in Alice (1978–1985).

Early years
Kaplan was born on January 24, 1927, in Brooklyn, New York, the son of Dr. I.E. Kaplan and his wife. He attended Public School 16, and Junior High School 50 and graduated from Eastern District High School in 1943. He graduated from Brooklyn College with a bachelor's degree in English in 1947 and later took classes in theater at the University of Southern California.

Television 
Kaplan is probably best known for his recurring role on the sitcom Alice where he portrayed a phone lineman named Henry Beesmeyer who frequented Mel's diner. He was with the cast from 1977 until the series ended in 1985.

In addition, the actor was the voice of Choo-Choo on the cartoon series Top Cat (1961–62).
 
He played an electronics expert, Ensign Kwasniak, on McHale's Navy episode 104 (season 3 episode 32) "All Ahead, Empty".
In 1969, he appeared as Stanley on Petticoat Junction in the episode: "The Other Woman".

In 1987, he reprised his role of Choo-Choo for Top Cat and the Beverly Hills Cats. At the same time, he actively returned to voice-over acting, playing roles in shows such as Garfield and Friends, Aaahh!!! Real Monsters, Johnny Bravo, and later, The Garfield Show in 2011. Kaplan was the commercial spokesperson for the American cologne Eau de Love. In addition to his role on Alice, he played Mr. Gordon on Becker alongside Ted Danson.

On cartoon series, Kaplan also provided the voices of Skids on CB Bears and Marvin on The Chicago Teddy Bears. In other roles, he portrayed Mr. Milfloss in The Many Loves of Dobie Gillis and Dwight McGonigle in On the Air.

Radio 
Kaplan had a regular role in the radio sitcom and later television version of Meet Millie as Alfred Prinzmetal, an aspiring poet-composer. The program ran from 1951–54 on radio and continued on television from 1952–56.

He joined the California Artists Radio Theatre In January 1984 and performed leading roles in over twenty 90 minute productions. He created two musicals for the group and one."A Good House For A Killing" is a successful Musical Comedy. He appeared in CART's Alice in Wonderland as the White Rabbit,:And In Norman Corwin's Plot to Overthrow Christmas with CART, as Nero's messenger opposite David Warner. He Was in CART's Bradbury 75th Birthday Tribute. He played opposite Jo Ann Worley in three CART productions :Corwin's 100th Birthday, Chekhov's Humoresque and in The Man With Bogart's Face" he was the Cowardly Lion in Cart's Wizard of Oz opposite Norman Lloyd and Linda Henning. And was the Lead in"Clarence" opposite Samantha Eggar and Janet Waldo; and Dr. Einstein opposite David Warner in Cart's Arsenic and Old Lace..He served on the Board for California Artists Radio Theatre for 32 years.
Marvin Kaplan appeared as Geppetto on Adventures in Odyssey's Club episode entitled The Tale of a Foolish Puppet Parts 1 & 2 recorded in 2014 and released in 2015.

Film 
Kaplan's first film role was as a court reporter in Adam's Rib (1949). He had a small role in the 1963 film It's a Mad, Mad, Mad, Mad World (1963) playing a gas station attendant alongside Arnold Stang, with whom he provided voices for the Top Cat cartoon series. He features in the supporting cast of the comedy The Great Race (1965). He also made a brief appearance as a carpet cleaner in the film Freaky Friday (1976).

Stage 
Kaplan gained early stage experience at a Los Angeles theater, working as stage manager on a production of ''Rain''. For many years, Kaplan was a member of Theatre West, the oldest continually-operating theatre company in Los Angeles.  He performed in many plays there and elsewhere.  He was also a playwright and screenwriter.

Personal life 

Kaplan was married to Rosa Felsenburg, a union that ended in divorce.

Death 
Kaplan died of natural causes in his sleep on August 25, 2016. He was 89 years old.

Filmography

Film

 Adam's Rib (1949) as Court Stenographer (uncredited)
 Francis (1950) as First Medical Corps lieutenant (uncredited)
 Key to the City (1950) as Francis – Newspaper Photographer (uncredited)
 The Reformer and the Redhead (1950) as Leon
 I Can Get It for You Wholesale (1951) as Arnold Fisher
 The Fat Man (1951) as Pinkie (uncredited)
 Criminal Lawyer (1951) as Sam Kutler
 Behave Yourself! (1951) as Max the Umbrella
 Angels in the Outfield (1951) as Timothy Durney
 The Fabulous Senorita (1952) as Clifford Van Kunkle
 Wake Me When It's Over (1960) as Hap Cosgrove
 The Nutty Professor (1963) as English Student
 A New Kind of Love (1963) as Harry
 It's a Mad, Mad, Mad, Mad World (1963) as Irwin, service station co-owner
 The Great Race (1965) as Frisbee
 The Severed Arm (1973) as Mad Man Herman
 Snakes (1974) as Brother Joy
 Freaky Friday (1976) as Carpet Cleaner
 Midnight Madness (1980) as Bonaventure Desk Clerk
 Saturday Supercade (1984) as Shellshock 'Shelly' Turtle (voice)
 Hollywood Vice Squad (1986) as man with doll
 Wild at Heart (1990) as Uncle Pooch 
 Delirious (1991) as Typewriter Repairman
 Witchboard 2: The Devil's Doorway (1993) as Morris
 Revenge of the Nerds IV: Nerds in Love (1994) as Mr. Dawson
 Dark and Stormy Night (2009) as Gunny
 Lookin' Up (2016) as Vic Greeley (final film role)

Television
 Meet Millie (1951-1954) as Alfred Prinzmetal  
 The Danny Thomas Show (1958) as Oscar 'Evil Eye' Schultz
 The Detectives (1961, Episode: "Hit and Miss") as Irwin
 Top Cat (1961–1962) as Choo-Choo (voice)
 Gomer Pyle, USMC (1968, Episode: "The Carriage Waits") as Mr. Kendall
 Mod Squad (1969) as Sol Alpert / Sol Albert
 I Dream of Jeannie (1970, Episode: "One of Our Hotels Is Growing") as Perkins
 Wait Till Your Father Gets Home (1972, Episode: "Love Story") as Norman
 CB Bears (1977) as Skids
 Charlie's Angels (1977, Episode: "Circus of Terror") as Zobar
 CHiPS (1978, Episode: "Disaster Squad") as Hilmer Nelson
 Alice (1978-1985) as Henry Beesmeyer
 MacGyver (1986, Episode: "A Prisoner of Conscience") as The Chess Master
 The Smurfs (1986) as Gourdy (voice)
 Top Cat and the Beverly Hills Cats (1988) as Choo-Choo (voice)
 Wake, Rattle & Roll (1990, Segment: "Fender Bender 500") as Choo Choo (voice)
 Monsters (1990, Episode: "Murray's Monster") as Murray Van Pelt
 Garfield and Friends (1991, Episode: "Moo Cow Mutt/Big Bad Buddy Bird/Angel Puss") as Angel Puss (voice)
 The Cartoon Cartoon Show (1995, Episode: "O. Ratz: Rat in a Hot Tin Can") as Dave D. Fly
 Johnny Bravo (1997, Episode: Going Batty/Berry the Butler/Red Faced in the White House) as Woody (voice)
 Becker (1998–2004) as Mr. Gordon
 Cool Cats in Interview Alley (2004, Video short) as himself
 The Garfield Show (2012) as Hiram "High" Pressure (voice)

References

External links

 
 
 Marvin Kaplan at Turner Classic Movies
 An interview with Marvin Kaplan, April 2012 – Part One
 An interview with Marvin Kaplan, April 2012 – Part Two
 Marvin Kaplan(Aveleyman)
 

1927 births
2016 deaths
American male film actors
American male voice actors
American male radio actors
American male television actors
Jewish American male actors
American male screenwriters
American male dramatists and playwrights
American dramatists and playwrights
Burials at Mount Hebron Cemetery (New York City)
People from Brooklyn
Male actors from New York City
20th-century American male actors
21st-century American male actors
Screenwriters from New York (state)
Eastern District High School alumni
Brooklyn College alumni
Hanna-Barbera people
21st-century American Jews